GRTensorII is a Maple package designed for tensor computations, particularly in general relativity.

This package was developed at Queen's University in Kingston, Ontario by Peter Musgrave, Denis Pollney and Kayll Lake.  While there are many packages which perform tensor computations (including a standard Maple package), GRTensorII is particularly well suited for carrying out routine computations of useful quantities when working with (or searching for) exact solutions in general relativity.  Its principal advantages include
convenience of definition of new spacetimes and tensor expression
efficient computation with frames
efficient computation of Ricci and Weyl spinor components and of Petrov classification
efficient computation of the Carminati-McLenaghan invariants and other curvature invariants
Currently, GRTensorII does have some drawbacks:
Maple is expensive
valuable subpackages for perturbation and junction computations have not been updated
no subpackage is yet publicly available in GRTensorII for executing the Cartan-Karlhede algorithm
sharing information with standard Maple packages can sometimes become awkward

References
 Not a textbook, but excellent supplementary reading.  The author uses GRTensorII, so this book is particularly well suited for use by students who have a working installation of this package.

External links
GRTensorII home page

General relativity